Block Island meteorite, officially named Meridiani Planum 006 shortened as MP 006, was found on Mars by the Opportunity rover on July 17, 2009.

History
Block Island was the first of three iron meteorites encountered by the rover on Meridiani Planum within a few hundred meters, the others being Shelter Island (the second meteorite found), and Mackinac Island (the third one found).

No strong evidence exists concerning when Block Island may have fallen on Mars, though atmospheric conditions would have favored its arrival in the late Noachian period. Block Island may be extensively weathered, or conversely the features covering it may simply be the regmaglypts formed by its passage through the atmosphere. Contrary to some claims, Block Island is not too large for the modern martian atmosphere to produce, though the denser the atmosphere the more effectively it would produce Block Island mass meteorites.

See also

 Atmospheric reentry
 Bounce Rock
 Glossary of meteoritics
 Heat Shield Rock
 List of Martian meteorites
 List of meteorites on Mars
 Oileán Ruaidh meteorite

References

Meteorites found on Mars
Rocks on Mars